John Tomas Radney (June 18, 1932 – August 7, 2011) was an American lawyer, civil rights pioneer and Democratic politician.

Early and family life
Born in Wadley, Randolph County, Alabama during the Great Depression, Radney graduated from Auburn University, where he was a member of the Phi Kappa Tau Fraternity,receiving a bachelor of science in education, then a master's degree in history in 1952. He received his law degree from University of Alabama School of Law in 1955. Radney served in the Judge Advocate General's Corps, United States Army during the Korean War.

In 1962, he married the former Madolyn Anderson, whose father had served in the Alabama Legislature. During their 49 years of marriage, they raised three daughters (Ellen Radney Price, Fran Radney Harvey and Hollis Radney Lovett) and a son, Thomas (Catie) Anderson Radney.

Career

Radney established a law office in Alexander City, the largest city in the area and the county seat of Tallapoosa County, Alabama. He had a legal practice both civil and criminal encompassing several surrounding counties. He also served as a municipal judge in Alexander City. Radney also served as President of the Board of Trustees at Alabama State University and of the  Alexander City Chamber of Commerce, as well as on the boards of trustees or directors of Huntington College, Carraway Methodist Hospital in Birmingham, and Russell Medical Center and the First Methodist Church in Alexander City. Radney was also active in the American Legion, Junior Chamber of Commerce, Kiwanis Club of Alexander City, Elks Lodge, and Masons.

A progressive Democrat, Radney became President of the Tallapoosa County Young Democrats, and won election to the Alabama State Senate in 1966. He served from 1967 until 1971. However, his progressive policies and support for John F. Kennedy during Massive Resistance in Alabama, particularly during the 1968 Democratic National Convention in Chicago caused death threats against his family, and Radney announced he would not seek further elective office to protect their safety. This drew attention to racial politics in the South, and Radney decided to run for Lieutenant Governor of Alabama in 1970, but lost the runoff election, and returned to his legal practice. He remained active in his political party, as a mentor to younger politicians as well as a long time member of the Alabama Democratic Executive Committee. On January 16, 2003, Alabama governor Don Siegelman declared "Tom Radney Day" and dozens of prominent Democrats attended Radney's receipt of the declaration, including former senator Howell Heflin and former congressman Ronnie Flippo. Radney had championed a rule which prevented candidates from running as a Democrat who had not supported the party's nominees in the previous four years.". He cherished the nickname "Mr. Alabama Democrat", particularly after Governor George Wallace left the party.

Death and legacy

Radney died after a long illness, but before celebrating his golden wedding anniversary. He was survived by his widow, four children and multiple grandchildren.

Notes

People from Randolph County, Alabama
People from Tallapoosa County, Alabama
Auburn University alumni
University of Alabama School of Law alumni
Military personnel from Alabama
United States Army Judge Advocate General's Corps
Alabama lawyers
Alabama state court judges
Democratic Party Alabama state senators
1932 births
2011 deaths
20th-century American judges
20th-century American lawyers